Crossopetalum ilicifolium, commonly known as Christmasberry, is a species of plant in the family Celastraceae. It is found in 	USA (Florida), Haiti, Dominican Republic, Bahamas, and Cuba.

References

ilicifolium